Juan Ramón Rocha (born 8 March 1954) is an Argentine professional football manager and former player, who is the current manager of Greek Super League 2 club Thesprotos.

Playing career

Born in Santo Tomé, Corrientes, Rocha began his professional career at Newell's Old Boys in 1972,  he was part of their Metropolitano winning team in 1974. He moved to Boca Juniors in 1979 and played in 1979 Copa Libertadores finals. In 1980, he was transferred to Greek soccer club Panathinaikos where he played until his retirement on July 1, 1989.

Nicknamed The Indian, Rocha was a skillful player, with vision and remarkable sportsmanship. He is considered by many one of the greatest players in the team's history. Rocha was first signed for Panathinaikos under the name Boublis with Greek papers; the subsequent discovery of record falsifications and ensuing scandal almost landed Rocha in jail and Panathinaikos in the second division. These allegations were later dismissed and both Panathinaikos and Rocha were acquitted. This was one of the many cases of "hellenization" of foreign players for many Greek soccer clubs.

Managerial career
After retirement he started coaching, first Paniliakos in where he was coach-player at the Fourth Division, then Iliasiakos, Kalamata FC and Skoda Xanthi. He was also the coach of Panathinaikos's semi final run in the 1995–96 UEFA Champions League. He also managed Olympiakos Nicosia in Cyprus.

He is now member of the scouting team of Panathinaikos, mostly searching players in Argentina and South America. After Jesualdo Ferreira resigned at 14 November 2012, Rocha once more became the manager of Panathinaikos.

On 11 September 2017 he was introduced as the coach of Ruch Chorzów.

Managerial statistics

Honours

Player
 Newell's Old Boys
Metropolitano: 1974

 Panathinaikos
Greek Cup: 1982, 1984, 1986, 1988, 1989
Alpha Ethniki: 1983–84, 1985–86

Manager
 Panathinaikos
Greek Cup: 1995
Alpha Ethniki: 1994–95, 1995–96

References

External links

Boca Juniors biography  

1954 births
Living people
People from Santo Tomé, Corrientes
Argentine footballers
Argentine expatriate footballers
Argentine football managers
Greek people of Argentine descent
Sportspeople of Argentine descent
Naturalized citizens of Greece
Argentine Primera División players
Super League Greece players
Boca Juniors footballers
Newell's Old Boys footballers
Atlético Junior footballers
Panathinaikos F.C. players
Panathinaikos F.C. managers
Paniliakos F.C. managers
Aris Thessaloniki F.C. managers
Xanthi F.C. managers
Expatriate footballers in Greece
Olympiakos Nicosia managers
Panathinaikos F.C. non-playing staff
Expatriate football managers in Cyprus
Expatriate football managers in Greece
Association football midfielders
Thesprotos F.C.
Sportspeople from Corrientes Province